Francium (87Fr) has no stable isotopes. A standard atomic weight cannot be given. Its most stable isotope is 223Fr with a half-life of 22 minutes, occurring in trace quantities as an intermediate decay product of 235U.

Of elements whose most stable isotopes have been identified with certainty, francium is the most unstable. All elements with atomic number of 106 (seaborgium) or greater have most-stable-known isotopes shorter than that of francium, but as those elements have only a relatively small number of isotopes discovered, the possibility remains that undiscovered isotopes of these elements may have longer half-lives.

List of isotopes 

|-
| 199Fr
|
| style="text-align:right" | 87
| style="text-align:right" | 112
| 199.00726(4)
| 16(7) ms
|
|
| 1/2+#
|
|-
| 200Fr
|
| style="text-align:right" | 87
| style="text-align:right" | 113
| 200.00657(8)
| 24(10) ms
| α
| 196At
| 3+#
|
|-
| rowspan=2 style="text-indent:1em" | 200mFr
| rowspan=2|
| rowspan=2 colspan="3" style="text-indent:2em" | 60(110) keV
| rowspan=2|650(210) ms
| α
| 196At
| rowspan=2|10−#
| rowspan=2|
|-
| IT (rare)
| 200Fr
|-
| rowspan=2|201Fr
| rowspan=2|
| rowspan=2 style="text-align:right" | 87
| rowspan=2 style="text-align:right" | 114
| rowspan=2|201.00386(8)
| rowspan=2|67(3) ms
| α (99%)
| 197At
| rowspan=2|(9/2−)
| rowspan=2|
|-
| β+ (1%)
| 201Rn
|-
| rowspan=2|202Fr
| rowspan=2|
| rowspan=2 style="text-align:right" | 87
| rowspan=2 style="text-align:right" | 115
| rowspan=2|202.00337(5)
| rowspan=2|290(30) ms
| α (97%)
| 198At
| rowspan=2|(3+)
| rowspan=2|
|-
| β+ (3%)
| 202Rn
|-
| rowspan=2 style="text-indent:1em" | 202mFr
| rowspan=2|
| rowspan=2 colspan="3" style="text-indent:2em" | 330(90)# keV
| rowspan=2|340(40) ms
| α (97%)
| 198At
| rowspan=2|(10−)
| rowspan=2|
|-
| β+ (3%)
| 202Rn
|-
| rowspan=2|203Fr
| rowspan=2|
| rowspan=2 style="text-align:right" | 87
| rowspan=2 style="text-align:right" | 116
| rowspan=2|203.000925(17)
| rowspan=2|0.55(2) s
| α (95%)
| 199At
| rowspan=2|(9/2−)#
| rowspan=2|
|-
| β+ (5%)
| 203Rn
|-
| rowspan=2|204Fr
| rowspan=2|
| rowspan=2 style="text-align:right" | 87
| rowspan=2 style="text-align:right" | 117
| rowspan=2|204.000653(26)
| rowspan=2|1.7(3) s
| α (96%)
| 200At
| rowspan=2|(3+)
| rowspan=2|
|-
| β+ (4%)
| 204Rn
|-
| rowspan=2 style="text-indent:1em" | 204m1Fr
| rowspan=2|
| rowspan=2 colspan="3" style="text-indent:2em" | 50(4) keV
| rowspan=2|2.6(3) s
| α (90%)
| 200At
| rowspan=2|(7+)
| rowspan=2|
|-
| β+ (10%)
| 204Rn
|-
| style="text-indent:1em" | 204m2Fr
| 
| colspan="3" style="text-indent:2em" | 326(4) keV
| 1.7(6) s
|
|
| (10−)
|  
|-
| rowspan=2|205Fr
| rowspan=2|
| rowspan=2 style="text-align:right" | 87
| rowspan=2 style="text-align:right" | 118
| rowspan=2|204.998594(8)
| rowspan=2|3.80(3) s
| α (99%)
| 201At
| rowspan=2|(9/2−)
| rowspan=2|
|-
| β+ (1%)
| 205Rn
|-
| rowspan=2|206Fr
| rowspan=2|
| rowspan=2 style="text-align:right" | 87
| rowspan=2 style="text-align:right" | 119
| rowspan=2|205.99867(3)
| rowspan=2|~16 s
| β+ (58%)
| 206Rn
| rowspan=2|(2+, 3+)
| rowspan=2|
|-
| α (42%)
| 202At
|-
| style="text-indent:1em" | 206m1Fr
| 
| colspan="3" style="text-indent:2em" | 190(40) keV
| 15.9(1) s
|
|
| (7+)
|
|-
| style="text-indent:1em" | 206m2Fr
|
| colspan="3" style="text-indent:2em" | 730(40) keV
| 700(100) ms
|
|
| (10−)
|
|-
| rowspan=2|207Fr
| rowspan=2|
| rowspan=2 style="text-align:right" | 87
| rowspan=2 style="text-align:right" | 120
| rowspan=2|206.99695(5)
| rowspan=2|14.8(1) s
| α (95%)
| 203At
| rowspan=2|9/2−
| rowspan=2|
|-
| β+ (5%)
| 207Rn
|-
| rowspan=2|208Fr
| rowspan=2|
| rowspan=2 style="text-align:right" | 87
| rowspan=2 style="text-align:right" | 121
| rowspan=2|207.99714(5)
| rowspan=2|59.1(3) s
| α (90%)
| 204At
| rowspan=2|7+
| rowspan=2|
|-
| β+ (10%)
| 208Rn
|-
| rowspan=2|209Fr
| rowspan=2|
| rowspan=2 style="text-align:right" | 87
| rowspan=2 style="text-align:right" | 122
| rowspan=2|208.995954(16)
| rowspan=2|50.0(3) s
| α (89%)
| 205At
| rowspan=2|9/2−
| rowspan=2|
|-
| β+ (11%)
| 209Rn
|-
| rowspan=2|210Fr
| rowspan=2|
| rowspan=2 style="text-align:right" | 87
| rowspan=2 style="text-align:right" | 123
| rowspan=2|209.996408(24)
| rowspan=2|3.18(6) min
| α (60%)
| 206At
| rowspan=2|6+
| rowspan=2|
|-
| β+ (40%)
| 210Rn
|-
| rowspan=2|211Fr
| rowspan=2|
| rowspan=2 style="text-align:right" | 87
| rowspan=2 style="text-align:right" | 124
| rowspan=2|210.995537(23)
| rowspan=2|3.10(2) min
| α (80%)
| 207At
| rowspan=2|9/2−
| rowspan=2|
|-
| β+ (20%)
| 211Rn
|-
| rowspan=2|212Fr
| rowspan=2|
| rowspan=2 style="text-align:right" | 87
| rowspan=2 style="text-align:right" | 125
| rowspan=2|211.996202(28)
| rowspan=2|20.0(6) min
| β+ (57%)
| 212Rn
| rowspan=2|5+
| rowspan=2|
|-
| α (43%)
| 208At
|-
| rowspan=2|213Fr
| rowspan=2|
| rowspan=2 style="text-align:right" | 87
| rowspan=2 style="text-align:right" | 126
| rowspan=2|212.996189(8)
| rowspan=2|34.6(3) s
| α (99.45%)
| 209At
| rowspan=2|9/2−
| rowspan=2|
|-
| β+ (.55%)
| 213Rn
|-
| 214Fr
|
| style="text-align:right" | 87
| style="text-align:right" | 127
| 213.998971(9)
| 5.0(2) ms
| α
| 210At
| (1−)
|
|-
| style="text-indent:1em" | 214m1Fr
|
| colspan="3" style="text-indent:2em" | 123(6) keV
| 3.35(5) ms
| α
| 210At
| (8−)
|
|-
| style="text-indent:1em" | 214m2Fr
|
| colspan="3" style="text-indent:2em" | 638(6) keV
| 103(4) ns
|
|
| (11+)
|
|-
| style="text-indent:1em" | 214m3Fr
|
| colspan="3" style="text-indent:2em" | 6477+Y keV
| 108(7) ns
|
|
| (33+)
|
|-
| 215Fr
|
| style="text-align:right" | 87
| style="text-align:right" | 128
| 215.000341(8)
| 86(5) ns
| α
| 211At
| 9/2−
|
|-
| rowspan=2|216Fr
| rowspan=2|
| rowspan=2 style="text-align:right" | 87
| rowspan=2 style="text-align:right" | 129
| rowspan=2|216.003198(15)
| rowspan=2|0.70(2) μs
| α
| 212At
| rowspan=2|(1−)
| rowspan=2|
|-
| β+ (2×10−7%)
| 216Rn
|-
| 217Fr
|
| style="text-align:right" | 87
| style="text-align:right" | 130
| 217.004632(7)
| 16.8(19) μs
| α
| 213At
| 9/2−
|
|-
| 218Fr
|
| style="text-align:right" | 87
| style="text-align:right" | 131
| 218.007578(5)
| 1.0(6) ms
| α
| 214At
| 1−
|
|-
| rowspan=2 style="text-indent:1em" | 218m1Fr
| rowspan=2|
| rowspan=2 colspan="3" style="text-indent:2em" | 86(4) keV
| rowspan=2|22.0(5) ms
| α
| 214At
| rowspan=2|
| rowspan=2|
|-
| IT (rare)
| 218Fr
|-
| style="text-indent:1em" | 218m2Fr
|
| colspan="3" style="text-indent:2em" | 200(150)# keV
|
|
|
| high
|
|-
| 219Fr
|
| style="text-align:right" | 87
| style="text-align:right" | 132
| 219.009252(8)
| 20(2) ms
| α
| 215At
| 9/2−
|
|-
| rowspan=2|220Fr
| rowspan=2|
| rowspan=2 style="text-align:right" | 87
| rowspan=2 style="text-align:right" | 133
| rowspan=2|220.012327(4)
| rowspan=2|27.4(3) s
| α (99.65%)
| 216At
| rowspan=2|1+
| rowspan=2|
|-
| β− (.35%)
| 220Ra
|-
| rowspan=3|221Fr
| rowspan=3|
| rowspan=3 style="text-align:right" | 87
| rowspan=3 style="text-align:right" | 134
| rowspan=3|221.014255(5)
| rowspan=3|4.9(2) min
| α (99.9%)
| 217At
| rowspan=3|5/2−
| rowspan=3|Trace
|-
| β− (.1%)
| 221Ra
|-
| CD (8.79×10−11%)
| 207Tl14C
|-
| 222Fr
|
| style="text-align:right" | 87
| style="text-align:right" | 135
| 222.017552(23)
| 14.2(3) min
| β−
| 222Ra
| 2−
|
|-
| rowspan=2|223Fr
| rowspan=2|Actinium K
| rowspan=2 style="text-align:right" | 87
| rowspan=2 style="text-align:right" | 136
| rowspan=2|223.0197359(26)
| rowspan=2|22.00(7) min
| β− (99.99%)
| 223Ra
| rowspan=2|3/2(−)
| rowspan=2|Trace
|-
| α (.006%)
| 219At
|-
| 224Fr
|
| style="text-align:right" | 87
| style="text-align:right" | 137
| 224.02325(5)
| 3.33(10) min
| β−
| 224Ra
| 1−
|
|-
| 225Fr
|
| style="text-align:right" | 87
| style="text-align:right" | 138
| 225.02557(3)
| 4.0(2) min
| β−
| 225Ra
| 3/2−
|
|-
| 226Fr
|
| style="text-align:right" | 87
| style="text-align:right" | 139
| 226.02939(11)
| 49(1) s
| β−
| 226Ra
| 1−
|
|-
| 227Fr
|
| style="text-align:right" | 87
| style="text-align:right" | 140
| 227.03184(11)
| 2.47(3) min
| β−
| 227Ra
| 1/2+
|
|-
| 228Fr
|
| style="text-align:right" | 87
| style="text-align:right" | 141
| 228.03573(22)#
| 38(1) s
| β−
| 228Ra
| 2−
|
|-
| 229Fr
|
| style="text-align:right" | 87
| style="text-align:right" | 142
| 229.03845(4)
| 50.2(4) s
| β−
| 229Ra
| (1/2+)#
|
|-
| 230Fr
|
| style="text-align:right" | 87
| style="text-align:right" | 143
| 230.04251(48)#
| 19.1(5) s
| β−
| 230Ra
|
|
|-
| 231Fr
|
| style="text-align:right" | 87
| style="text-align:right" | 144
| 231.04544(50)#
| 17.6(6) s
| β−
| 231Ra
| (1/2+)#
|
|-
| 232Fr
|
| style="text-align:right" | 87
| style="text-align:right" | 145
| 232.04977(69)#
| 5(1) s
| β−
| 232Ra
|
|

References 

 Isotope masses from:

 Isotopic compositions and standard atomic masses from:

 Half-life, spin, and isomer data selected from the following sources.

 
Francium